Portland Street is a popular street in Kowloon, Hong Kong. The street is known for its business and retailing skyscraper complex Langham Place, numerous restaurants and its red-light district.

Geography
Running north-south and parallel to (and west of) Nathan Road, a main thoroughfare up the Kowloon peninsula, Portland Street extends through the districts of Yau Ma Tei and Mong Kok in Kowloon. Approximately three-quarters of a mile in length, it spans between Boundary Street in the north and Man Ming Lane, at one block past Waterloo Road in the south. The street is directly accessible by the Prince Edward, Mong Kok and Yau Ma Tei station of the MTR, Hong Kong's subway system.

Except for a few small parks, the entire two-lane street is highly urbanised with dense pedestrian and motor traffic throughout most of the day.

Character

A section of Portland Street, particularly between Argyle Street and Dundas Street, hosts arguably Hong Kong's most famous red light district (serving mostly local Chinese clientele) and a popular scene in Hong Kong films. There, underneath a dizzying and chaotic array of neon signs, one can find prostitutes from around the world (although mostly from mainland China) serving in hundreds of massage parlours, night clubs, karaoke/hostess bars and brothels. Although prostitution is legal in Hong Kong, law enforcement is often active in this area conducting raids for prostitutes who entered Hong Kong illegally or have overstayed their visas or to search for under-aged prostitutes, pimps, human traffickers and triad activities.

Langham Place, a 167,000 square meter (1.8 million square foot) shopping centre, theatre, hotel and office tower complex opened on Portland Street near the Nelson Street intersection in July 2004. The complex has its own MTR station access (Mong Kok station exit C3). Outside one of the complex's east entrances is a large 'jumbotron' broadcasting news and entertainment shows for pedestrians below. Since its opening, Langham Place and surrounding areas has become a popular night-time destination for both locals and tourists. Some had predicted the massive upscale development would gentrify the area and drive away the Portland Street sex trade. However, after several years of operation, Langham Place's impact on the nearby sex industry remains minimal.

The Portland Street segment between Argyle Street and Bute Street is home to over 50 retailers selling home renovation materials and supplies such as toilet utensils, tiles, and wallpapers.

Other establishments along Portland Street includes fast-food restaurants, congee/noodle shops, convenience stores and working class residential highrises. Near the Soy Street intersection during the evenings, there are often unlicensed food stands and professional Chinese Chess players plying their trades. Further south, there is a small public playground at the Changsha Street intersection.

History
Portland Street was named after William Cavendish-Bentinck, 3rd Duke of Portland, Prime Minister of the United Kingdom in 1783 and between 1807 and 1809. It is unclear why the street was bestowed in his honour although, as a former British colony, many of Hong Kong's streets and institutions were named in memory of prominent English historic and political figures. Surrounding streets with similarly naming scheme include Pitt Street, Bute Street, Arran Street, Hamilton Street, Dundas Street and Waterloo Road.

There is a street in London named Great Portland Street. There is also a street in Edinburgh named Portland Street which is not far from Pitt Street and Dundas Street (as mentioned above, Hong Kong's Portland Street is also nearby Pitt Street and Dundas Street). In both cases it is not clear if there is any relation or relevance to the Hong Kong Portland Street.

Photo gallery

Transportation
Mong Kok station Exit C2, C4, E1

See also
 List of streets and roads in Hong Kong
 Portland Street Blues, a 1998 Hong Kong film
 Prostitution in Hong Kong

External links

Map of Portland Street
About name (in Chinese)

Mong Kok
Yau Ma Tei
Roads in Kowloon